James Jefferson Webster III (born 1966), also known as Jeff Webster, is an American competitive checkers player and musician. Webster was the National Youth Checkers Champion in 1981 and the World Youth Checkers Champion in 1982.

Early life and family 
Jeff Webster was born in 1966 to James Jefferson Webster II and Mary Elizabeth Comer. He grew up in Stoneville, North Carolina and graduated from Stoneville High School in 1983. He is a grandson of James Jefferson Webster, who served as county commissioner of Rockingham County. Through his paternal grandmother, Nannie Hurt Strong, he is descended from Scottish emigrants George Irving and Jane McDonald, who came to the United States in 1834 from Closeburn, Dumfriesshire aboard the Hector, and is a descendant of the Colonial Virginian Robertson family. Webster is the nephew of checkers champion John Ray Webster and a distant cousin of mathematician Ione Grogan.

Career

Checkers 
Webster began playing checkers at his grandfather's general store when he was 14 years old, being taught largely by his uncle. He won the United States youth national checkers championship in Texas in 1980. On December 31, 1981 he competed in the World Youth Checkers Championship in Bristol, England. He defeated Andrew Knapp, the English national champion, and became the first person to win the title of World Youth Checkers Champion.

In 2015 he placed second in the Tennessee State Open Majors Division in Lebanon, Tennessee. In 2019 Webster was ranked 47th in the nation and 103rd in the world.

Music 
Webster began playing piano when he was 14 years old. He was formerly a member of the bands Outta Time and Disaster Recovery Band. He is currently the keyboardist for The Impacts, a rock and beach music band based in Madison, North Carolina.

Webster serves as a member of the 2019-2020 Advisory Grassroots Panel for the Rockingham County Arts Council.

Personal life 
Webster married Annie Herger Manning in 2008. In 2009 he underwent a quadruple bypass at Moses H. Cone Memorial Hospital.

References 

Living people
1966 births
American checkers players
American people of Scottish descent
American United Methodists
Jeff
Musicians from North Carolina
People from Rockingham County, North Carolina
Players of English draughts